Sir Michael Cromie, 1st Baronet (circa 1744 – 14 May 1824) was an Anglo-Irish politician. 

Cromie was the Member of Parliament for Ballyshannon in the Irish House of Commons between 1776 and 1797. On 3 August 1776 he was created a baronet, of Stacombrie in the Baronetage of Ireland. He was succeeded in his title by his son, William.

References

Year of birth uncertain
1824 deaths
18th-century Anglo-Irish people
Baronets in the Baronetage of Ireland
Irish MPs 1776–1783
Irish MPs 1783–1790
Irish MPs 1790–1797
Members of the Parliament of Ireland (pre-1801) for County Donegal constituencies